Jeffrey M. Paul (born March 1, 1978) is a Canadian former professional ice hockey player and current coach of the Kladno Knights of the Czech Republic  Extraliga. He played in 10 professional seasons.

Born in London, Ontario, he was drafted to the National Hockey League in 1996 by the Chicago Blackhawks in the 2nd round, 42nd overall. He played two games in the NHL for the Colorado Avalanche during the 2002–03 season. On September 1, 2005, Paul was  signed as a free agent by the Montreal Canadiens. Paul last played professionally for SHC Fassa in Italy's Serie A.

He served as a one-time assistant coach of the London Knights of the Ontario Hockey League during the 2012–13 season.

Career statistics

Regular season and playoffs

References

External links

1978 births
Canadian expatriate ice hockey players in Germany
Canadian expatriate ice hockey players in Italy
Canadian ice hockey defencemen
Chicago Blackhawks draft picks
Cleveland Lumberjacks players
Colorado Avalanche players
Erie Otters players
Florida Panthers scouts
Füchse Duisburg players
Hamilton Bulldogs (AHL) players
Hershey Bears players
Ice hockey people from Ontario
Indianapolis Ice players
Living people
Niagara Falls Thunder players
Norfolk Admirals players
Portland Pirates players
San Antonio Rampage players
SHC Fassa players
Sportspeople from London, Ontario